Rose Hill is a historic home located near Chestertown, Kent County, Maryland.  It is a 40-foot square, two-story brick structure built during the latter half of the 18th century.

It was listed on the National Register of Historic Places in 1976.

References

External links

, including photo from 1977, at the Maryland Historical Trust

Houses in Kent County, Maryland
Houses on the National Register of Historic Places in Maryland
Historic American Buildings Survey in Maryland
National Register of Historic Places in Kent County, Maryland